is a Japanese actress. She made her screen debut in 1955 and appeared in nearly 90 films. In 1960 Akiko Koyama married film director Nagisa Oshima, and appeared in some of his films.

Selected filmography 
 Night and Fog in Japan (1960)
 Violence at Noon (1966)
 Death by Hanging (1968)
 Boy (1969)
 The Ceremony (1971)
 Wandering Ginza Butterfly (1972)
 Karate Warriors (1976)
 In the Realm of the Senses (1976)
 Empire of Passion (1978)

References

External links
 
 Roger Pulvers: In the Realms of true Love and Devotion few could fault Akiko Koyama

Japanese film actresses
1935 births
Living people
Actors from Chiba Prefecture
20th-century Japanese actresses